Ilze Hattingh (born 22 April 1996) is a South African former professional tennis player.

Born in Durban, Hattingh was introduced to tennis at the age of seven. On the ITF Junior Circuit, she was ranked as high as world No. 49, which she achieved in January 2013. She has held the position as South Africa's junior number one girl tennis player on multiple occasions.

On the ITF Women's Circuit, she reached one $10k semifinal in singles, in Potchefstroom in December 2012. She also made her debut for the South Africa Fed Cup team in 2012.

Career

2013
Hattingh began her 2013 campaign with back to back junior tournaments in Australia, the Grade-1 Loy Yang Power Traralgon International and the Australian Open, but lost in the first round of both. She then continued her training before resuming competitive play at three back to back Grade 2's in her home country, starting on 18 February. She reached semifinals of all three in singles, and claimed one doubles title alongside Madrie Le Roux. The strong performance boosted her junior ranking up to a career high of world No. 49.

In May, Hattingh was given a wildcard for the main draw of a $50k tournament in Johannesburg, but was knocked out by eventual finalist Chanel Simmonds in round one.

Hattingh returned to the ITF Junior Circuit in June, playing a Grade-1 event in Germany as the 15th seed. Following a bye in the first round, she reached the semifinals with the loss of one set, and but lost to Iryna Shymanovich on 15 June for a place in the final. This is the deepest she has gone into a Grade-1 draw. Ilze then proceeded to play four more junior tournaments in Europe, including Wimbledon, but didn't achieve much success, losing in qualifying at Wimbledon and failing to reach the quarterfinals of any other tournament.

At the end of the 2013 season, Hattingh competed in four consecutive $10k events in Sharm El Sheikh. As a qualifier, she reached the quarterfinals of two of the singles tournaments and was runner-up at one doubles tournament with close friend Madrie Le Roux. The professional breakthrough earned Ilze her first WTA singles and doubles rankings.

2017
Hattingh joined the Arizona State University tennis programme in the United States where she plays mainly at the No. 2 position.

ITF Circuit finals

Singles: 2 (1–1)

Doubles: 17 (10–7)

Fed Cup participation

Singles

Doubles

External links
 
  
 

1996 births
Living people
South African female tennis players
Sportspeople from Pretoria
Sportspeople from Durban
White South African people
Arizona State Sun Devils women's tennis players